Caneadea Bridge, also known as East Hill Road Bridge, is a historic steel truss bridge that carries County Road 46 (locally East Hill Road) over the Genesee River in Caneadea, Allegany County, New York. It is listed on the National Register of Historic Places.

History
In 1902, a catastrophic flood washed away the previous bridge. Shortly after, the town of Caneadea hired the Groton Iron Bridge Company for a replacement span; the new bridge was completed in November 1903.

The bridge was nominated for inclusion on the National Register of Historic Places under Criterion C for its engineering significance as a surviving early twentieth-century bridge. In a NYSDOT survey, it was the oldest and longest of two surviving camelback truss bridges in New York. The bridge was listed on the National Register on November 19, 1998.

In 1993, the Allegany County Department of Public Works declared the bridge unsafe and it was closed because the county could not afford to replace it. The closure was an inconvenience, forcing some drivers to go south and cross the river at Belfast before heading back to Caneadea. The Save the Caneadea Bridge Committee worked for the next fourteen years to raise funds for rehabilitation; an undisclosed sum was raised, plus about $550,000 in state funding. The bridge reopened in 2007, and the remaining $9,037.42 was assigned for maintenance.

The bridge was closed again on June 26, 2012, because of structural deterioration. In August 2012, an engineering firm was hired to study what would need to be done to reopen the bridge to traffic.

Design
The ends of the bridge retain the original metal cresting and decorative plates bearing the bridge company name and former town names.

See also

National Register of Historic Places listings in Allegany County, New York
List of bridges and tunnels on the National Register of Historic Places in New York

References

Bibliography
 See also:

External links

Road bridges on the National Register of Historic Places in New York (state)
Bridges completed in 1903
Buildings and structures in Allegany County, New York
Transportation in Allegany County, New York
National Register of Historic Places in Allegany County, New York
Steel bridges in the United States
Parker truss bridges in the United States